Les Liaisons dangereuses is a 1985 play by Christopher Hampton adapted from the 1782 novel of the same title by Pierre Choderlos de Laclos. The plot focuses on the Marquise de Merteuil and the Vicomte de Valmont, rivals who use sex as a weapon of humiliation and degradation, all the while enjoying their cruel games. Their targets are the virtuous (and married) Madame de Tourvel and Cécile de Volanges, a young girl who has fallen in love with her music tutor, the Chevalier Danceny. In order to gain their trust, Merteuil and Valmont pretend to help the secret lovers so they can use them later in their own treacherous schemes.

1985 Royal Shakespeare Company
Staged by the Royal Shakespeare Company, the play opened at The Other Place in Stratford-upon-Avon on 24 September 1985. Directed by Howard Davies, the cast included Lindsay Duncan as the Marquise de Merteuil, Alan Rickman as the Vicomte de Valmont, Juliet Stevenson as Madame de Tourvel, Lesley Manville as Cécile de Volanges, and Sean Baker as the Chevalier Danceny.

On 8 January 1986, the production transferred to The Pit, an intimate studio theatre in the Barbican Centre in London, with its original cast intact. Christopher Hampton won the Evening Standard Award for Best Play and the Laurence Olivier Award for Best New Play, and Lindsay Duncan received the Laurence Olivier Award for Best Actress. In October 1986, with only a few cast changes, the production transferred again to the Ambassadors Theatre in the West End.
A recording of The Pit production can be listened to on premises, at the British Library.

1987 Broadway
Lindsay Duncan and Alan Rickman reprised their roles for the Broadway production, also directed by Howard Davies. Following eight previews, it opened at the Music Box Theatre on April 30, 1987 and ran for 149 performances. Christopher Hampton was nominated for the Tony Award for Best Play and the Drama Desk Award for Outstanding Play, but lost both to August Wilson for Fences. Duncan won the Theatre World Award and Davies won the Tony Award for Best Direction of a Play. The show won the 1987 New York Drama Critics' Circle Award for Best Foreign Play.

1988 film adaptation

Hampton adapted the play for the screen in a 1988 film version directed by Stephen Frears.

2008 Broadway
Following 22 previews, a Broadway revival produced by the Roundabout Theatre Company opened at the American Airlines Theatre on May 1, 2008 and ran for 77 performances. Directed by Rufus Norris, the cast included Laura Linney as the Marquise de Merteuil, Ben Daniels as the Vicomte de Valmont, Mamie Gummer as Cécile de Volanges, and Benjamin Walker as the Chevalier Danceny, with Siân Phillips in the supporting role of Madame de Rosemonde. The production was nominated for the Tony Award for Best Revival of a Play but lost to Boeing-Boeing.

2012 Sydney Theatre Company
Hampton's play was produced by the Sydney Theatre Company and performed at the Wharf Theatre as part of the 2012 season. The production was directed by Sam Strong, with Hugo Weaving playing the Vicomte de Valmont and Pamela Rabe the Marquise de Merteuil. Strong said that he liked the line given to Rosamonde “The only thing which might surprise one is how little the world changes” because it "speaks directly to the timelessness of the piece's exploration of human behaviour, from the less savoury parts like betrayal and manipulation to the best parts like being in love." He also said he was "intrigued by the paradoxical nature of the Valmont and Tourvel story – the manner in which Valmont is both redeemed and destroyed by love at the same time". One reviewer noted that "Director Sam Strong's beautifully paced production emphasises gratification via the wielding of power rather than via lust."<ref>[http://www.stagemilk.com/les-liaisons-dangereuses-stc/ Review by Alexandra Joel, Les Liaisons Dangereuses"], Stage Milk</ref>

2016 revival
The play was revived at the Donmar Warehouse in the winter of 2015–16, the first time it had received a major outing in London since its 1986 premiere. The director was Josie Rourke, with the roles of Valmont and Mme de Merteuil played by Dominic West and Janet McTeer respectively. The production transferred to Broadway in a limited engagement with McTeer joined by Liev Schreiber and Mary Beth Peil as Madame de Rosemonde. The play opened at the Booth Theatre on October 30, 2016. The Broadway production closed earlier than expected, on January 8, 2017 (rather than on January 22.)

References

Further reading
Hampton, Christopher. Les Liaisons Dangereuses''. London: Faber & Faber 1985.

External links

 

1985 plays
West End plays
Laurence Olivier Award-winning plays
Broadway plays
Plays based on novels
British plays adapted into films
Works based on Les Liaisons dangereuses